Hainault Bulldogs are a rugby league team based in Dagenham, Greater London. They play in the South Premier Division of the Rugby League Conference.

History
Hainault Bulldogs were formed in 2007 by former Leeds and London Broncos player Kevin Reith. The 2007 season saw the Bulldogs beat all-comers within the London League and narrowly lose to a Metropolitan Police side in a friendly. The Bulldogs beat St Albans Centurions 'A' side in the semi-finals and then beat Eastern Raiders 30-4 in the final.

2008 saw the Bulldogs form two teams, with the first team in the Rugby League Conference and a development team in the London League. The first team finished the season champions of the RLC Eastern Division and reached the semi-finals of the national play-offs.

2009 saw the Bulldogs compete in the RLC Premier and after a disastrous start managed to win 4 of their last 5 games to finish 8th out of 10. Hainault Bulldogs 'A' failed to complete the 2009 season in the Eastern Division but will be competing in the London League in 2010.

Hainault Bulldogs failed to complete the 2011 season in the South Premier division and had their fixtures taken over by London Skolars A.

Juniors
Hainault's juniors take part in the London Junior League.

Honours :

Under 16s London League North

Under 14s London League North

Club honours
 London League: 2007
 RLC Eastern Division: 2008
 RLC Best New Club 2008
 U16s London League North 2009
 U12s London League North 2009

External links
 Official site

Rugby League Conference teams
Sport in the London Borough of Barking and Dagenham
Rugby league teams in London
Rugby clubs established in 2007